Qul Hajji (also Romanized as Qūl Ḩājjī; also known as Qolhaji) is a village in Fajr Rural District, in the Central District of Gonbad-e Qabus County, Golestan Province, Iran. At the 2006 census, its population was 1,160, in 252 families.

References 

Populated places in Gonbad-e Kavus County